"Seely Simpkins Jig" is a song by American songwriter Dan Emmett. Emmett named the song for Seeley Simpkins, a resident of Knox County, Ohio, well known for his fiddle playing and whistling. Simpkins' property neighbored that of Thomas Snowden, a man whom Howard L. and Judith Sacks credit with helping Emmett write the song "Dixie". "Seely Simpkins Jig" was later published as a quickstep in Fife Instructor, a manual by Emmett.

Notes

References

 Sacks, Howard L, and Sacks, Judith (1993). Way up North in Dixie: A Black Family's Claim to the Confederate Anthem. Washington: Smithsonian Institution Press.

Blackface minstrel songs
19th-century songs
Songs written by Dan Emmett
Year of song missing